Gates is the plural of gate, a point of entry to a space which is enclosed by walls. It may also refer to:

People
 Gates (surname), various people with the last name
 Gates Brown (1939-2013), American Major League Baseball player
 Gates McFadden (born 1949), American actress and choreographer
 Gates P. Thruston (1835-1912), American Civil War veteran, lawyer and businessman
 Josephine Gates Kelly (1888-1976), Native American activist

Places

Canada
 Gates, British Columbia, Canada, a rural community
 Gates River, a river in British Columbia
 Gates Valley, a valley in British Columbia
 Gates Lake, at the head of the Gates River

United States
 Gates, Nebraska, an unincorporated community
 Gates, New York, a town
 Gates (CDP), New York, census-designated place
 Gates, Oregon, a city
 Gates, Tennessee, a town
 Gates County, North Carolina, United States
 Gates, North Carolina, an unincorporated community in the county
 Gates Pass, Arizona, a mountain pass

Art and entertainment
 Gates (character), a fictional character, an insectoid member of the Legion of Super-Heroes
 Gates (band), a post rock band from New Jersey
 Gates (TV series), a 2012 UK situation comedy TV series
 The Gates (TV series), a 2010 American supernatural crime drama television series on ABC
 The Gates, an art installation by Christo and Jeanne-Claude in Central Park in New York City

Other uses
 Gates Airport (disambiguation)
 Gates Bar-B-Q, a restaurant in Kansas City, Missouri
 Gates Corporation, a manufacturer of power transmission belts and fluid power products

See also

 Bill & Melinda Gates Foundation
 Gates Learjet, former name of aircraft manufacturer Learjet Corporation
 , a US Navy cruiser
 Gate (disambiguation)
 The Gate (disambiguation)
 Gating (disambiguation)